Inang Laya (Filipino: Mother Freedom) is a Filipino folk music duo known for its activist lyrics, particularly its strong opposition to the Martial Law dictatorship of Ferdinand Marcos.

References 

Filipino rock music groups
Musical groups from Metro Manila
Musical groups established in 1981